Kirit Parmar is an Indian politician who is serving as Mayor and First Citizen of Ahmedabad from 10 March 2021. He also served as Councillor from 2010 to 2020.

Personal life 
He was born on 13 August 1966 in Ahmedabad. He is the member of Rashtriya Swayamsevak Sangh from his childhood. There is a road in Ahmedabad, Mayor Kirit Parmar Road which is named after him.

References 

Mayors of Ahmedabad
Living people
Bharatiya Janata Party politicians from Gujarat
1966 births
Rashtriya Swayamsevak Sangh members